Andersen is a surname. It may also refer to:

 Andersen Air Force Base, Guam, a United States Air Force base
 Andersen Corporation, a manufacturer of windows and other building supplies
 Andersen Consulting, former name of Accenture, Plc
 Andersen Press, a publisher

See also
 Andersen's disease
 Arthur Andersen, a former tax and consulting firm
 Pea Soup Andersen's, a restaurant chain in California